Radhe Shyam is a 2022 Indian period romantic drama film written and directed by Radha Krishna Kumar. Produced by UV Creations and T-Series, the film was shot simultaneously in Telugu and Hindi languages and stars Prabhas and Pooja Hegde. It also features Bhagyashree, Sathyaraj, Jagapathi Babu, Krishnam Raju, Sachin Khedekar, Murali Sharma and Jayaram in supporting roles. Set in 1970s Italy, the film revolves around palmist Vikramaditya, who is conflicted between destiny and his love for Dr. Prerana.

The film's score is composed by Thaman S for the Telugu version while Sanchit Balhara and Ankit Balhara too composed for the Hindi version. The film has two soundtracks: One Hindi and one Telugu. Mithoon, Amaal Mallik and Manan Bhardwaj composed the Hindi songs while Justin Prabhakaran composed the Telugu songs. The cinematography is handled by Manoj Paramahamsa and editing done by Kotagiri Venkateswara Rao. Principal photography of the film commenced in October 2018 and ended in July 2021, with filming taking place in Hyderabad, Italy and Georgia.

Originally planned for a release on 30 July 2021, it was delayed due to the COVID-19 pandemic. Radhe Shyam was theatrically released on 11 March 2022 and received mixed to positive reviews, and received praise for the performances (particularly Prabhas and Pooja Hegde), music direction and production values from critics. The film was a box office bomb.

Plot

In 1978 Italy, Vikramaditya aka Aditya is a world-renowned palmist. After having read the palm of the Prime Minister Indira Gandhi and mentioned about The Emergency (India), he runs to Rome. Dubbed as the "Einstein of palmistry," he is a disciple of the saint Paramahamsa. Aditya does not believe in romantic relationships, but instantly falls for Dr. Prerana, a beautiful and clumsy young doctor. They meet on a train but separate thereafter. One day, Adityanath reads the palm of Anand Rajput, an aspiring politician and businessman. When Aditya predicts that Rajput cannot be a politician, Rajput's men chase him which results in him having an accident. He is admitted into the hospital where Prerana works and is treated there. After recovering, Aditya proposes to Prerana to be in a flirtationship with him. Prerana, however feels insulted and leaves town but Aditya follows her all the way. She accepts his proposal and they begin to date. Prerana's uncle, Dean Chakravarthy, however, asks her not to develop any deep feelings toward Aditya.

When Aditya and Prerana are traveling on a train, a stranger requests him to read the palm of his daughter, Tara, an aspiring archer. He predicts that she does not have any future in sports, and she should instead focus on education. Amazed by Aditya's skill, everyone in the coach ask for predictions by showing their palm but Aditya hesitantly gets down along with Prerana. However, he realizes that everyone on the train is destined for immediate death. He chases the train to stop it but in vain. Later that evening, the train meets an accident, leading to several casualties. Prerana, who starts to believe in palmistry, asks Aditya to read her palm. He predicts that she would have a long life with a bright future but she faints immediately with a bleeding nose. Prerana is admitted to the hospital where her uncle, who is also a doctor, reveals that she is suffering from an incurable tumor and may die within months. Aditya disagrees since he predicted otherwise but is expelled from the hospital.

Prerana is now hopeful of her life. Her uncle, on the other hand, believes Aditya is a fraud and that only medicine can change her fate. He tests Aditya with five dead people's palms, and Aditya deduces all of them correctly. Her uncle changes his mind and trusts Aditya's prediction. When a cure for Prerana's disease is found, an elated Prerana proposes to Aditya. However, he rejects her by saying he cannot love her as he does not possess a "love line" and would be leaving the country soon. Dejected, Prerana attempts suicide but comes across Aditya's diary. She learns that Aditya was prepared to sacrifice his life to save her. Before leaving, Aditya takes Prerana to a ballroom dance as per her wish and the couple spends the night intimately. Prerana leaves a note in the diary that she'd choose to give up her life instead when such situation arises. She willingly meets a car accident and is admitted to the hospital.

Aditya, who is in London for his mother's dance show, reads Prerana's note in the diary. He calls the hospital and is shocked to know the condition of Prerana. He urges Prerana to live, promising to meet her soon. When Aditya is in a dilemma about his prediction, he comes across Tara who has lost her hand in the accident. She tells Aditya that since she does not have a palm now, she can write her destiny. Aditya, who is now in hurry to meet Prerana, boards a cargo ship to Italy which is captained by a person he met in the hospital. However, the ship is caught by a storm in the sea and everyone abandons the ship on the captain's orders. Aditya, however, is trapped on the ship alone. Overwhelmed by the force of nature, Aditya struggles to survive. He recalls his guru Paramahamsa's assertion that palmistry is only 99% accurate, and there are 1% of the people script their own destiny. Determined to survive, he uses all his strength to reach a high point and fires a flare gun. The captain returns with a lifeboat. The ship sinks but the drowned Aditya remains afloat. Later, Aditya arrives at the hospital and reunites with the recovered Prerana. Aditya proposes to Prerana and she accepts. The film ends with Tara winning in paralympic archery and Aditya and Prerana's marriage.

Cast

Production

Development 
Radhe Shyam was originally conceived by director Chandra Sekhar Yeleti. He worked with his assistant Radha Krishna Kumar to develop the story but the idea was dropped after they failed to give it a conclusion. Kumar borrowed the storyline from Yeleti, and worked on it for eighteen years to give the story a satisfactory ending. He narrated the script to actor Prabhas while he was shooting for the Baahubali series (2015–17). Prabhas liked the script and signed up for the project.

Kumar initially wanted to set the story in the backdrop of a hill station in India. However, the story was moved to Europe following Prabhas' suggestion. Radha Krishna Kumar revealed that the protagonist Vikramaditya's character is inspired by real life European palmist Cheiro. Several titles including Jaan and O Dear were considered for the film but the makers finalized Radhe Shyam as the film's title.

The film was formally launched on 5 September 2018 in Hyderabad, tentatively titled as Prabhas 20. Pooja Hegde was cast opposite Prabhas. Hegde called the film a "fresh and mature love story". Veteran actress Bhagyashree is cast in a crucial role in the film. The film is a romantic drama set in 1970's Europe.

Filming 
The film is shot simultaneously in Telugu and Hindi languages. Principal photography commenced on 6 October 2018. Filming took place in Hyderabad, Turin (Italy) and Georgia, after which it was suspended due to COVID-19 pandemic in March 2020. Filming resumed in Italy in October 2020. In December 2020, several scenes were shot at the Falaknuma Palace in Hyderabad. Final schedule of the film began on 25 June 2021 in Hyderabad. Filming was completed on 28 July 2021.

Music

The film has distinct Hindi and Telugu albums. The Hindi soundtrack is composed by Mithoon and Manan Bhardwaj while Justin Prabhakaran is composing the songs in the Telugu version (in addition to Tamil, Kannada, and Malayalam versions). Manoj Muntashir and Krishna Kanth are providing lyrics for Hindi and Telugu soundtrack respectively.

Release

Theatrical 
Radhe Shyam was released in cinemas on 11 March 2022. Earlier, the film was scheduled to release on 30 July 2021, however, it was postponed due to the COVID-19 pandemic in India. Later in July 2021, it was announced that the film will be released on 14 January 2022 but in early-January, UV Creations announced that film was postponed due to the Omicron variant. In February 2022, it was announced that the film is scheduled to be released on 11 March 2022. The film was released in Telugu, Hindi, Tamil, Kannada, and Malayalam languages.

The film had done a pre-release business of  crore from the sale of theatrical rights.

Home media 
The film's satellite rights were acquired by Zee Entertainment Enterprises in all languages, while the digital distribution rights were acquired by Amazon Prime Video. Zee News stated "The film has fetched its makers a whopping amount of Rs 200 crores just from the satellite and digital rights before it hit the screens". The film began streaming on Prime Video in Telugu, Tamil, Kannada, and Malayalam on 1 April 2022. The Hindi version started streaming on Netflix after 3 May 2022. The Hindi version is also available on Zee5.

Reception

Critical response 
Deccan Herald stated that reviews were mixed to positive, and received praise for the performances(particularly Prabhas and Pooja Hegde), music direction and production values. The Times of India stated that reviews were mixed. DNA India and The Indian Express reported that reviews were mixed to negative, stating that the writing and narration met with criticism. Hindustan Times mentioned that reviews were negative.

A reviewer from The Hans India gave the film a rating of 3.5/5 and wrote "Prabhas aka Vikramaditya and Pooja Hegde aka Perana's heart-touching love story showcases how love wins the destiny!" Sowmya Rajendran of The News Minute gave the film a rating of 3/5 and stated "Though the lead pair is likable together, they're not really convincing as epic lovers like Radhe-Shyam, after whom the film is titled." Rachana Dubey of The Times of India gave the film a rating of 2.5/5 and wrote "The bland chemistry between Pooja and Prabhas is a deterrent in this love story. The VFX deserves an applause, and adds to the visual quality of the film." Janani K of India Today gave the film a rating of 2.5/5 and wrote "Prabhas and Pooja Hegde's Radhe Shyam has great potential in its premise. However, apart from brilliant visuals and production design, the film lacks soul". A reviewer from Pinkvilla gave the film a rating of 2.5/5 and wrote "Prabhas is sincere in some scenes but looks demotivated when the writing fails him. Thaman's background music lacks novelty."

A Deccan Chronicle critic gave the film a rating of 2.5/5 and wrote "Perhaps better and stronger writing could have taken Radhe Shyam to a different level." Saibal Chatterjee of NDTV gave the film a rating of 2/5 and wrote "Prabhas and Pooja Hegde are saddled with a screenplay that allows them little room for manoeuvre. The end result is calamitous." Siby Jeyya of India Herald gave the film a rating of 2/5 and wrote "The first half of the film is artistically and visually stunning. The second period is slow and complex on the surdata-face. Even though the film isn't genuinely bad, it still felt like wasting our money and time." Shubhra Gupta of The Indian Express gave the film a rating of 1/5 and wrote "Prabhas-starrer expects us to swallow, hook, line and so many sinkers, and we are constantly collecting our jaws off the floor."

Sangeetha Devi Dundoo of The Hindu stated "A shallow story and lacklustre screenplay make Radhe Shyam a colossal bore." Monika Rawal Kukreja of Hindustan Times stated "Prabhas and Pooja Hegde's film is packed with romance, songs, VFX, grand outdoors but not a lot of logic or good writing." Sonil Dedhia of News18 stated "The Prabhas and Pooja Hegde starrer ends up as one of those big budget attempts that's highly ambitious and silly at the same time."

Box office 
According to the makers, the film had a total worldwide gross of  crore on its opening day. On the second day the film had a worldwide gross of  crore making the worldwide gross of 2 days to  crore. On the third day the film had a worldwide gross of  crore making the opening weekend collection  crore gross. IB Times stated "Among the overseas centres, Radhe Shyam did well at the US box office where it minted Rs 13.8 crore with a distributors' share of Rs 6.9 crore in the three-day first weekend".

, the film had a total worldwide gross of  crore. Jatinder Singh of Pinkvilla wrote that "The film is a big disaster at the box office as the film netted  crore from 4 days in India and it is even difficult for the film to reach even  crore". The makers claimed that the film grossed  crore at the box office in 10 days, however, The Indian Express reported, "the other estimates put the film's worldwide collection so far well below the Rs 150 crore mark." The film had a huge dip in its collections on its first Monday with  crore (nett).

Notes

References

External links 
 
 

2022 films
2022 multilingual films
2022 romance films
Cultural depictions of Indira Gandhi
Film productions suspended due to the COVID-19 pandemic
Films set in Europe
Films shot in Georgia (country)
Films shot in Hyderabad, India
Films shot at Ramoji Film City
Films shot in India
Films shot in Italy
Indian multilingual films
Films scored by Thaman S
UV Creations films
Indian romantic drama films
2020s Telugu-language films
2020s Hindi-language films
Films set in London
Films set in 1978
Films set in Rome
Films set in Italy
Films about pseudoscience